In Greek mythology, Orneus (Ancient Greek: Ὀρνεύς) may refer to two different personages:

 Orneus, an Athenian prince as the son of King Erechtheus and probably Praxithea, daughter of Phrasimus and Diogeneia. His possible siblings were Protogeneia, Pandora, Creusa, Procris, Oreithyia, Chthonia, Merope, Cecrops, Pandorus, Metion, Thespius, Eupalamus and Sicyon. Orneus was the father of Peteus and through the latter became the grandfather of Menestheus, successor of Theseus. The town of Orneae is believed to be named after him. Otherwise, the eponym of the land was attributed to the naiad Ornea, daughter of the river-god Asopus and Metope.
 Orneus, one of the centaurs who attended Pirithous' wedding. He fought against the Lapiths and fled.

Notes

References 

 Apollodorus, The Library with an English Translation by Sir James George Frazer, F.B.A., F.R.S. in 2 Volumes, Cambridge, MA, Harvard University Press; London, William Heinemann Ltd. 1921. ISBN 0-674-99135-4. Online version at the Perseus Digital Library. Greek text available from the same website.
 Diodorus Siculus, The Library of History translated by Charles Henry Oldfather. Twelve volumes. Loeb Classical Library. Cambridge, Massachusetts: Harvard University Press; London: William Heinemann, Ltd. 1989. Vol. 3. Books 4.59–8. Online version at Bill Thayer's Web Site
 Diodorus Siculus, Bibliotheca Historica. Vol 1-2. Immanel Bekker. Ludwig Dindorf. Friedrich Vogel. in aedibus B. G. Teubneri. Leipzig. 1888–1890. Greek text available at the Perseus Digital Library.
Lucius Mestrius Plutarchus, Lives with an English Translation by Bernadotte Perrin. Cambridge, MA. Harvard University Press. London. William Heinemann Ltd. 1914. 1. Online version at the Perseus Digital Library. Greek text available from the same website.
 Pausanias, Description of Greece with an English Translation by W.H.S. Jones, Litt.D., and H.A. Ormerod, M.A., in 4 Volumes. Cambridge, MA, Harvard University Press; London, William Heinemann Ltd. 1918. . Online version at the Perseus Digital Library
 Pausanias, Graeciae Descriptio. 3 vols. Leipzig, Teubner. 1903.  Greek text available at the Perseus Digital Library.
 Publius Ovidius Naso, Metamorphoses translated by Brookes More (1859-1942). Boston, Cornhill Publishing Co. 1922. Online version at the Perseus Digital Library.
Publius Ovidius Naso, Metamorphoses. Hugo Magnus. Gotha (Germany). Friedr. Andr. Perthes. 1892. Latin text available at the Perseus Digital Library.
Stephanus of Byzantium, Stephani Byzantii Ethnicorum quae supersunt, edited by August Meineike (1790-1870), published 1849. A few entries from this important ancient handbook of place names have been translated by Brady Kiesling. Online version at the Topos Text Project.
 Suida, Suda Encyclopedia translated by Ross Scaife, David Whitehead, William Hutton, Catharine Roth, Jennifer Benedict, Gregory Hays, Malcolm Heath Sean M. Redmond, Nicholas Fincher, Patrick Rourke, Elizabeth Vandiver, Raphael Finkel, Frederick Williams, Carl Widstrand, Robert Dyer, Joseph L. Rife, Oliver Phillips and many others. Online version at the Topos Text Project.

Princes in Greek mythology
Centaurs
Attican characters in Greek mythology